Xylophanes fernandezi is a moth of the  family Sphingidae. It is known from Colombia and Venezuela.

The length of the forewings is 44–47 mm. It is similar to Xylophanes tersa tersa and Xylophanes resta but differs in its dark, monotonous appearance. The head and thorax are dark brown to brown-black dorsally. The dorsal scaling of the antenna is dirty white. The abdomen is ash-brown dorsally with five dark longitudinal lines. The basal black patches are present. Laterally, stripes are paler rust-brown. The forewing upperside ground colour is ash-brown and the postmedian lines are indistinct (the fourth line is most prominent). The hindwing upperside is as in Xylophanes tersa tersa but the median band consists of a row of cream-coloured spots.

The larvae probably feed on Rubiaceae and Malvaceae species.

References

fernandezi
Moths described in 1996